Byron Black and Wayne Ferreira were the defending champions, but Black did not compete this year. Ferreira teamed up with Kevin Ullyett and lost in the semifinals to tournament runner-ups Jan-Michael Gambill and Scott Humphries.

Paul Kilderry and Sandon Stolle won the title by walkover, as Gambill was injured during the singles final due to knee and ankle sprains.

Seeds

Draw

Draw

References

External links
 Official results archive (ATP)
 Official results archive (ITF)

Los Angeles Open (tennis)
2000 ATP Tour